The Maserati Tipo V4 was a grand tourer-style torpedo car, designed, developed, and built by Italian manufacturer Maserati, between 1929 and 1932. It was also notably the first production car to be powered by a V-16 engine.

References

Maserati vehicles
Grand tourers
1920s cars
1930s cars
Cars introduced in 1929
Pre-war vehicles